Global Development Alliances (GDA) is a program of the United States Agency for International Development (USAID).  It was created in May 2001 as a new way for the U.S government to provide aid to developing countries through public-private partnerships. From 2001 to 2016, USAID formed 1500 of such partnerships with over 3 500 private sector organisations. The goal of these partnerships are to provide market-based solutions to problems faced by developing countries as identified by USAID.

See also
 Economic Development
 Public-private partnerships in the United States

References

External links
 Global Development Alliance Homepage
 Harvard Ash Institute Innovation Awards Program 

Independent agencies of the United States government
International development agencies
International development programs